JACS or Jacs may refer to:

 Jewish Alcoholics, Chemically Dependent Persons and Significant Others
 Joint Academic Coding System, a system to classify academic subjects in the United Kingdom
 Journal of the American Ceramic Society
 Journal of the American Chemical Society
 JACS Au, a monthly online journal published by the American Chemical Society
 Journal of the American College of Surgeons
 Jacs Holt, a character in the television series Wentworth

See also
 JAC (disambiguation)